Charles Lawrence Arthur Smith (1 January 1879 – 22 November 1949) was an English cricketer active from 1898 to 1911 who played for Sussex and was club captain in 1906 and 1909. He was born and died in Henfield. He appeared in 220 first-class matches as a righthanded batsman who bowled right arm medium fast. He scored 5,844 runs with a highest score of 103 not out and took nine wickets with a best performance of one for 0. Smith was the son of Charles Hamlin Smith and a nephew of Arthur Smith.

Notes

1879 births
1949 deaths
English cricketers
Sussex cricketers
Sussex cricket captains
Gentlemen of the South cricketers
People from Henfield